The Sir Winston Churchill Bowl was one of two semi-final bowl games played in Canadian Interuniversity Sport football that would determine a participant in the Vanier Cup national championship. The trophy was originally donated and managed by McGill University to serve as an annual, often pre-season, invitational football contest between the sister universities of McGill and UBC in aid of the Canadian Paraplegic Association. The Churchill Bowl was retired in 2003 and replaced by the Mitchell Bowl.

History 
The Churchill Bowl was originally created for Canadian University football invitational competition in 1953. The trophy was a sculpture created by R. Tait McKenzie entitled "The Onslaught".

Many of the games were regarded as an unofficial national championship of Canada, although three other university football leagues were not invited to play and disputed this claim. From 1953 through 1958 the game was a pre-season interconference exhibition. In 1959 and 1960, the Churchill Bowl was switched to a post-season game, pitting the Yates Cup and Hardy Trophy champions against each other in the first attempt in an unofficial national championship. There were eleven unofficial national championship or challenge games played between 1953 and 1964.

Staging games could prove to be difficult at times. In 1961 the Queen's Golden Gaels were the Yates Cup champions scheduled to play the Western Canadian Hardy Cup champion Alberta Golden Bears. However, the Ontario Intercollegiate Football Conference champion McMaster Marauders challenged Queen's to a post-season match which the Gaels were forced to play. With no game scheduled, the McGill Redmen hosted the Jewett Trophy champion St. Francis Xavier X-Men.

In 1963, the Hardy and Yates champions again faced off in the "Golden Bowl" between the Alberta Golden Bears and Queen's Golden Gaels, but McGill chose to hold onto to Churchill Bowl and play the Atlantic champion St. FX for a third consecutive year. Alberta's 25-7 victory marked the first major western victory over an eastern team, with McGill also losing to the X-Men in the Churchill. These events spurred an effort to create an official national championship.

When the Vanier Cup was staged as an official national championship in 1965, the trophy was retired. From 1968 to 1988 one of the national semi-final games was variously named Western Bowl, Forest City Bowl and Central Bowl.

In 1989, the CIAU requested and were given permission by the trustees of the trophy to reinstate the award for annual presentation to the winner of the National semi-final game, the Churchill Bowl. The trophy was taken out of storage at McGill and presented as the winner of this game. The winner of the Atlantic Bowl would meet the winner of the Churchill Bowl for the Vanier Cup. In 2003, the Churchill Bowl game was renamed the Uteck Bowl in honour of Larry Uteck. The trophy was retired for the second time.

Churchill Bowl Games

(*) Note: The Ottawa Gee-Gees were forced to forfeit all of their post-season titles in 1997 because they had ineligible players on their roster.

References

U Sports football trophies and awards